The Texas Mini GP Series is an American organization that promotes and hosts small motorcycle road races in Texas.
Most races are held at local kart tracks, but others are organized in conjunction with the Central Motorcycle Roadracing Association at larger tracks like Oak Hill Raceway and Texas World Speedway.

Many well known riders have raced with the TMGPS, including Nicky Hayden, Ben Spies, Logan Young, Will Gruy, Joe Prussiano and Phillip Fisher.

In the beginning, the ride of choice was the Yamaha YSR50; but today the pits are littered with everything from YSR's and NSR's to XR100's, TTR125's, and Groms.

Popular bikes are KX65’s and KLX110’s fitted with 12” tires on custom rims. Mitas and PMT and two most popular tire makers, although Bridgestone, Dunlop, and Pirelli now offer tires in this size as well. Newer bikes by OVHALE are bringing back GP style frames which run 10” tires.

Classes are run in Endurance and Sprint races.  4-6 Hr Endurance races typically held at each event with 6-8 lap Sprint races on Sunday.

The various classes run in 2020 were as follows:

Endurance classes:

 GROM
 Formula 7 – Novice
 Formula 7 – Expert
 Formula 6
 Formula 5

Sprint Classes:

 Supersport
 Superbike
 Scooter
 Formula 7 - Novice
 Formula 7 - Expert
 Formula 7 - Lightweight
 Formula 7 - Heavyweight
 Formula 6 - Novice
 Formula 6 - Expert
 Formula 6 - Lightweight
 Formula 6 - Heavyweight
 Formula 5 - Novice
 Formula 5 - Expert
 Formula 5 - Lightweight ***New
 Formula 5 - Heavyweight ***New
 Dinosaurs
 Double D
 Ladies
 GROM
 GP F6 ***New Name
 GP F7 ***New Name
 12 & Under
 Unlimited
 Backwards - Novice
 Backwards - Expert
 Jr. Motard
 Motard - Novice
 Motard - Expert
 Pit Bike 50

 webpage

Motorcycle road racing series